Virgil's can refer to:

Virgil's Root Beer, an American root beer
Anything relating to the Roman poet Publius Vergilius Maro, better known as Virgil
Virgil's aeneid, a Latin epic poem, written by Virgil between 29 and 19 BC
Virgil's tomb, a Roman burial vault in Naples, said to be the tomb of the poet Virgil
Virgil's Tomb (Joseph Wright paintings) (1779–1785), the title of at least three paintings completed by Joseph Wright of Derby

See also
St Virgil's College, an Australian school